Waleed Salem Sulaiman Surour Al Jaberi (born 28 October 1980) is an Emarati footballer who plays as a goalkeeper .

He was the first choice goalkeeper at 2010 AFC Champions League, played 5 out of possible 6 matches.

External links
 
   Waleed Statistics At Goalzz.com
 http://www.alainfc.net/en/index.php?p=playerinfo&pid=337

1980 births
Living people
Emirati footballers
Al Ain FC players
Al Urooba Club players
2004 AFC Asian Cup players
2007 AFC Asian Cup players
Footballers at the 2002 Asian Games
UAE First Division League players
UAE Pro League players
Association football goalkeepers
Asian Games competitors for the United Arab Emirates
United Arab Emirates international footballers